Censorship in Korea may refer to:

 Censorship in South Korea
 Censorship in North Korea